The 1983–84 Sheffield Shield season was the 82nd season of the Sheffield Shield, the domestic first-class cricket competition of Australia. Western Australia won the championship.

Table

Final

Statistics

Most Runs
John Dyson 1066

Most Wickets
Jeff Thomson 47

References

Sheffield Shield
Sheffield Shield
Sheffield Shield seasons